In automotive design terminology, the name breezeway has been used to describe the sometimes reverse-slanted, power-operated retractable rear window ("backlite") which, when opened even slightly, provided through ventilation. Typical models with this feature are the 1957-1958 Mercury Turnpike Cruisers and some 1963–1968 full-size Mercurys, including some Park Lanes, Montclairs, and Montereys. Although never officially referred to as a breezeway window, the same retractable rear window was standard on the 1958–1960 Continental Mark III, IV, & V, and even on their convertible body style.

References 

Car windows